Events from the year 2007 in Angola

Incumbents
 President: José Eduardo dos Santos 
 Prime Minister: Fernando da Piedade Dias dos Santos
 President of the National Assembly: Roberto Victor de Almeida

Events

January

February

March

April

May

June

 June 28: A TAAG-Angola Airlines Boeing 737 crashes in northern Angola resulting in the death of at least five passengers on the same day the European Union bans the airline from European airspace.

July

August

 August 21: The governments of Angola and the Democratic Republic of the Congo are negotiating over a line demarcating each nation's respective rights to petroleum in the Atlantic Ocean. The DRC is expected to gain exploration rights to billions of untapped barrels worth of oil.

September

 September 21: Angolan police arrest Jomo Gbomo, the head of the Movement for the Emancipation of the Niger Delta, a rebel organization in Nigeria.

October

November

December

Deaths

 August 2: Holden Roberto, 84, founder and leader of the FNLA (1962–1999), after long illness.

References